North  is the debut solo album by Irish folk singer Mary Dillon, released on January 28, 2013 on Back Lane Records.

Track listing

Personnel
Mary Dillon - vocals
Odhrán Mullan - piano; shaker; bowed bass, fiddle, pipes, percussion (track 9)
Eamon McElholm - guitar (tracks 1,3,4,6,9); bass (track 3)
Ted Ponsonby - guitar, dobro (track 2)
Eddie O'Donnell - guitar (track 7)
Neil Martin - cello; low whistle (track 7)
Brendan Mulholland - flute
Frank Cassidy - mandola
Cara Dillon - backing vocals (track 2)
Clodagh Warnock - fiddle (tracks 4,6)
Gerdy Thompson - guitar (track 2)
Tomaí Taylor - bodhrán
Tom Byrne - accordion

Production
Mary Dillon - producer
Odhrán Mullan - producer, engineer, mixing, artwork & design
Shawn Joseph - mastering

References

External links
Album Reviews

2013 debut albums
Mary Dillon albums